King Krule is the first EP by King Krule, released on 8 November 2011.

Reception

On Metacritic, the EP has received an average review score of 73/100, indicating "generally favorable" reviews.

Track listing

References

2011 EPs
King Krule albums
True Panther Sounds albums